Stephen Hoyt was the 26th mayor of New Orleans (February 9, 1864 – March 21, 1865).

Mayors of New Orleans